This article deals with Derry City Football Club records.

Honours

League titles: 5
Irish Football League: 1964-65
League of Ireland: 1988–89, 1996–97
League of Ireland First Division: 1986–87, 2010
FAI Cup: 6
 1989, 1995, 2002, 2006, 2012, 2022
League of Ireland Cup: 11 
1988-89, 1990–91, 1991–92, 1993–94, 1999–2000, 2005, 2006, 2007, 2008, 2011, 2018
IFA Cup: 3 
1948–49, 1953–54, 1963–64
League of Ireland First Division Shield: 1
1985–86 
City Cup: 2
1935, 1937 
Gold Cup: 1
1964 
Top Four Winners: 1
1966
North-West Senior Cup: 14 
1931–32, 1932–33, 1933–34, 1934–35, 1936–37, 1938–39, 1953–54, 1959–60, 1961–62, 1962–63, 1963–64, 1965–66, 1968–69, 1970–71

Domestic football
See 2019 League of Ireland for a general overview of Derry City's current season.
Derry compete in a number of major domestic competitions on an annual basis. Those include the League of Ireland, the FAI Cup and the League of Ireland Cup. They can also take part in the cross-border Setanta Sports Cup, on condition of qualification for the tournament based on performances in the three former competitions. Prior to 1973 the club's main domestic competitions were the Irish League and the IFA Cup.

League of Ireland
Up until the end of the 2006 season, Derry had played a total of 691 League of Ireland games since joining in 1985. 306 of these games had been won (44.28%), 197 had been drawn (28.51%) and 188 had been lost (27.21%). In the process, 951 goals were scored (an average of 1.38 goals per game) and 651 were conceded (an average of 0.94 goals per game). With 993 points being accumulated over those League of Ireland years, Derry managed an average of 1.44 points per game.

First season of the League of Ireland's 5 year merger with the FAI.
League reduced from 12 teams to 11 teams mid-season after Dublin City FC resigned so all their games were expunged from the record and the league table re-calculated. This also occurred in 2012 when Monaghan United withdrew from the league.
On goal difference. 
League increased from 10 competing teams to 12 competing teams from start of this season onward (until 2009 when Premier Division will be reduced to 10 teams, as planned by FAI).
League changed to 'Summer season' from start of this season onward.
League reduced from 12 competing teams to 10 competing teams from outset of season. Lasted for 3 further seasons until end of 2004 season.
Changed from two points to three for a win from start of this season onward.
Top and bottom halves of league split into two groups of 6 teams for two concluding relegation and title mini-series. Concept lasted for two seasons.
Promoted from First Division to Premier Division after finishing top of division and  remained there until they were expelled from the league at the end of the 2009 season, where they re-entered the first division and won it at the first attempt.
Season Derry City first entered First Division. Division made up of 10 teams for all of Derry's period of taking part.

(Complete list of Premier Division standings)
(Complete list of First Division standings)

FAI Cup
Derry City have appeared in the FAI Cup final on 10 occasions, winning 5 of those.

 After replay.
 This was second FAI Cup final in 2002 due to a 'Winter transition season' being played to allow for the new 'Summer season' to proceed in March 2003.
 After extra-time.
 Bohemians won on penalties.

(Complete record)

League of Ireland Cup
Derry City have appeared in the League of Ireland Cup final on 12 occasions, winning 10 of those.

 Dundalk won on penalties.
 Aggregate score after two legs.
 Limerick won on penalties.
 Derry City won on penalties.
  Derry City scored in extra time.

IFA Cup
Derry City have appeared in the IFA Cup final on 6 occasions, winning 3 of those.

 After replay and extra-time.
 After two replays.

Setanta Cup
Derry City appeared in the cross-border Setanta Cup final once in a losing effort.

 Crusaders won on penalties.

European record

Overview

Matches

 (Full details)

UEFA coefficient and ranking
Derry City's UEFA coefficient accumulates to a total value of 2.250 as of April 2022.

Current club ranking
 361  Folgore
 361  Sant Julià
 361  Floriana
 361  Zeta Golubovci
 361  Derry City
 361  Dinamo-Auto Tiraspol
 361  Speranta Nisporeni
 https://kassiesa.net/uefa/data/method5/trank2022.html

Player records

Record appearances in the League of Ireland

Senior international players to have played for Derry City

Competitive managerial records in the League of Ireland

 Acted as player-manager. Record includes two games – a win and a loss – against Dublin City which were expunged from the records after being contested.

Other records
Derry City's first ever goalscorer was Peter Burke against Glentoran on 22 August 1929.
On 24 August 1929, Sammy Curran had the honour of scoring Derry City's first senior hat-trick, as the club came back from 5–1 down against Portadown FC, only to lose 6–5 to a late goal.
The club's all-time highest goal-scorer is Jimmy Kelly with 363 goals during a spell of over 20 years at the club between 1930 and the early 1951.
Terry Kelly, who captained Derry City in 1985, was the first football player in the world to captain a club he played with in two different national leagues.
Barry McCreadie was Derry's first goalscorer in the League of Ireland. He scored during a 3–1 home win over Home Farm on 8 September 1985.
Derry City's first hat-trick in the League of Ireland was scored by Kevin Mahon away at Finn Harps on 15 December 1985.
Derry City's record league defeat was to Shamrock Rovers in March, 2018. The score was 6–1.
Derry City's record league victory was a score of 9–1 against Galway United in October, 1986.
The club's highest scorer in the League of Ireland is Mark Farren, who played for the club from 2003 until 2012. Farren scored 114 goals in 209 competitive appearances for the club.
Derry City completed a treble in the League of Ireland 1988–89 season. Shamrock Rovers are the only others to have completed this feat — three times in total.
Derry are one of only three clubs (the others are Shelbourne and Bohemians) who have won both the Irish Cup and the FAI Cup.
Derry are the only team in Ireland to have won both the Irish League and the League of Ireland.
Derry played in the first League of Ireland match ever to be shown live on television when they visited Tolka Park to play Shelbourne FC during the 1996–97 season. The game was broadcast on RTÉ's Network 2 and finished 1–1 with Gary Beckett scoring for Derry.
In 2005, Kevin McHugh became one of just a handful of current players to join the 38-strong group of players who have scored 100 or more League of Ireland goals in the modern era.
Derry's 5–1 away win against Gretna FC at Fir Park, Motherwell in the 2006–07 UEFA Cup's Second Qualifying Round is the largest away winning margin for any League of Ireland team in European competition.
Derry's FAI Cup final game against St. Patrick's Athletic on 3 December 2006 was the last soccer game ever to be contested at the old Lansdowne Road stadium before the commencement of planned re-development. Derry won the wind-swept game 4-3 after extra-time.
Derry City is a unique club, due to its troubled and fluctuant history, in that it is one of the few clubs from the United Kingdom (and the only club in Northern Ireland) to play in the league of another country – the league of the Republic of Ireland in the case of Derry City. (See Football clubs playing in the league of another country for further general information.)
Derry City hold the record for the most League of Ireland Cup wins, having won the competition 11 times.
In 2018 Jack Doyle scored the 1500th League of Ireland goal for the club in a 1–0 win over Waterford at the Brandywell

References

Further reading

 ,

External links
Official club site:
CityWeb
News and information sites:   
Derry City F.C. on UEFA.com   
UEFA.com article about Derry City F.C.
Derry City's FAI Cup history on RTÉ.ie 
Historical seasonal standings of the Irish League from the Rec.Sport.Soccer

Records
Irish association football club statistics